NZE may refer to:
 New Zealand, UNDP code
 New Zealand English, the variety of English spoken in New Zealand
 Nzérékoré Airport, Guinea (by IATA code)

See also
 Nze (disambiguation)
 Nzé (disambiguation)
 N'Ze (disambiguation)